The qualifying phase of the 2019–20 CONCACAF Nations League was a one-off tournament that took place from 6 September 2018 to 24 March 2019. The qualifying determined the seeding for the group phase of the inaugural tournament, as well as determining the remaining ten teams that qualified for the 2019 CONCACAF Gold Cup.

Format
Apart from the six teams which participated in the 2018 FIFA World Cup qualifying hexagonal, the other 34 teams (Guatemala could not enter due to FIFA suspension after missing the deadline of 1 March 2018) entered qualifying. The format for the qualifying stage was based on the Pots System, developed by Chilean Leandro Shara. Under that format, the teams are divided into pots for scheduling purposes only, and all teams face rivals from each pot, and all teams are placed under one general standing (without groups). Subsequently, the 34 teams were divided into four pots, and each team played four matches, two home and two away. Based on their results in the general standing, the teams were divided into tiers for the group phase of the inaugural edition of the CONCACAF Nations League:
The top six teams qualified for League A to join the six hexagonal participants.
The next sixteen teams qualified for League B.
The last twelve teams qualified for League C to join Guatemala.

Moreover, the top ten teams qualified for the 2019 CONCACAF Gold Cup to join the six hexagonal participants.

Tiebreakers
The ranking of teams in qualifying was determined as follows:

 Points obtained in all qualifying matches;
 Goal difference in all qualifying matches;
 Number of goals scored in all qualifying matches;
 Number of away goals scored in all qualifying matches;
 Fair play points in all qualifying matches (only one deduction could be applied to a player in a single match): 
 Drawing of lots.

Seeding
The 34 teams were seeded into four pots based on their position in the March 2018 CONCACAF Ranking Index (shown in parentheses). Pots A and D contained 8 teams, while pots B and C contained 9 teams. Teams in bold qualified for the final tournament.

Schedule and match pairings
The order of the match pairings per each FIFA match window was as follows:

The draw of the qualifying fixtures was held on 7 March 2018, 10:00 EST (UTC−5), at The Temple House in Miami Beach, Florida, United States, directly after the launch event of the CONCACAF Nations League. A computerized pre-draw produced a "master schedule", creating 17 fixtures for each matchday. The teams in each pot were then drawn to the corresponding positions in the schedule (A1–A8, B1–B9, C1–C9, D1–D8). The computer model assured that no teams face each other more than once, and that each team plays two home and two away matches.

The result of the draw was as follows:

Standings

Summary

|-
!colspan=3|Matchday 1

|-
!colspan=3|Matchday 2

|-
!colspan=3|Matchday 3

|-
!colspan=3|Matchday 4

|}

Matches
The match dates were announced on 29 May 2018, with the venues announced in August and September 2018. The March 2019 match schedule was revised by CONCACAF in January 2019.

Times in September, October and March are Eastern Daylight Time (UTC−4), while times in November are Eastern Standard Time (UTC−5), as listed by CONCACAF. If the venue was located in a different time zone, the local time is also given.

Matchday 1

Matchday 2

Matchday 3

Matchday 4

Goalscorers

Qualified teams for CONCACAF Gold Cup

At the end of the CONCACAF Nations League qualifying, the top ten teams qualified for the 2019 CONCACAF Gold Cup together with the six participants of the 2018 FIFA World Cup qualifying Hexagonal (with their Gold Cup qualification confirmed at the draw of CONCACAF Nations League qualifying on 7 March 2018).

1 Bold indicates champions for that year. Italic indicates hosts for that year.

Notes

References

External links

Qualifying
Nations League
September 2018 sports events in North America
October 2018 sports events in North America
November 2018 sports events in North America
March 2019 sports events in North America
2019-20